The following is a list of Idaho Vandals men's basketball head coaches. There have been 32 head coaches of the Vandals in their 118-season history.

Idaho's current head coach is Alex Pribble. He was hired as the Vandals' head coach in March 2023, replacing Zac Claus, who was fired before the start of the 2023 Big Sky tournament.

References

Idaho

Idaho Vandals basketball, men's, coaches